Messaging Layer Security (MLS), is a security layer for end-to-end encrypting messages in arbitrarily sized groups. It is being built by the IETF MLS working group and designed to be efficient, practical and secure.

Security properties
Security properties of MLS include message confidentiality, message integrity and authentication, membership authentication, asynchronicity, forward secrecy, post-compromise security, and scalability.

History
The idea was born in 2016 and first discussed in an unofficial meeting during IETF 96 in Berlin with attendees from Wire, Mozilla and Cisco.

Initial ideas were based on pairwise encryption for secure 1:1 and group communication. In 2017, an academic paper introducing Asynchronous Ratcheting Trees was published by University of Oxford setting the focus on more efficient encryption schemes.

The first BoF took place in February 2018 at IETF 101 in London. The founding members are Mozilla, Facebook, Wire, Google, Twitter, University of Oxford, and INRIA.

Implementations 

 OpenMLS: language: Rust, license: MIT
 MLS++: language: C++, license: BSD-2

References 

Cryptography
Internet privacy
Secure communication